Leonard Kleinrock (born June 13, 1934) is an American Internet pioneer, computer scientist, and is considered one of the "fathers of the Internet". He is a long-tenured professor at UCLA's Henry Samueli School of Engineering and Applied Science.

In the early 1960s, Kleinrock pioneered the application of queueing theory to model delays in message switching networks in his Ph.D. thesis, published as a book in 1964. He later published several of the standard works on the subject. In the early 1970s, he applied queueing theory to model the performance of packet switching networks. This work played an influential role in the development of the ARPANET. He supervised many graduate students who worked on the communication protocols for internetworking which led to the Internet protocol suite. His theoretical work on hierarchical routing in the late 1970s with student Farouk Kamoun remains critical to the operation of the Internet today.

Education and career
Leonard Kleinrock was born  in New York City on June 13, 1934, to a Jewish family, and  graduated from the noted Bronx High School of Science in 1951. He received a Bachelor of Electrical Engineering degree in 1957 from the City College of New York, and a master's degree and a doctorate (Ph.D.) in electrical engineering and computer science from the Massachusetts Institute of Technology in 1959 and 1963 respectively. He then joined the faculty at the University of California at Los Angeles (UCLA), where he remains to the present day; during 1991–1995 he served as the chairman of the Computer Science Department there.

Achievements

Queueing theory
Kleinrock's best-known and most-significant work is on queueing theory, a branch of operations research that has applications in many fields. His thesis proposal in 1961 led to a doctoral thesis at the Massachusetts Institute of Technology in 1962, later published in book form in 1964. In this work, he analyzed queueing delays in Plan 55-A, a message switching system operated by Western Union for processing telegrams. Kleinrock later published several of the standard works on the subject.

ARPANET
Larry Roberts brought Leonard Kleinrock into the ARPANET project informally in May 1967. Roberts learned about packet switching from a paper written by Donald Davies, presented at the October 1967 Symposium on Operating Systems Principles. Roberts subsequently incorporated the concept into the ARPANET design. He formally contracted with Kleinrock in 1969 to measure the performance of packet switching in the ARPANET. Kleinrock's mathematical work in the early 1970s influenced the development of the early ARPANET.

The first message on the ARPANET was sent by a UCLA student programmer, Charley Kline, who was supervised by Kleinrock. At 10:30 p.m, on October 29, 1969 from Boelter Hall 3420, the school's main engineering building, Kline transmitted from the university's SDS Sigma 7 host computer to the Stanford Research Institute's SDS 940 host computer. The message text was the word "login"; the "l" and the "o" letters were transmitted, but the system then crashed. Hence, the literal first message over the ARPANET was "lo". About an hour later, having recovered from the crash, the SDS Sigma 7 computer effected a full "login". The first permanent ARPANET link was established on November 21, 1969, between the Interface Message Processor (IMP) at UCLA and the IMP at the Stanford Research Institute. By December 5, 1969, the initial four-node network was established.

Subsequently, he managed the software team at UCLA — including Steve Crocker, Vint Cerf and Jon Postel — who developed the host-host protocol for the ARPANET, the Network Control Program (NCP). 

Kleinrock used the ARPANET for instant messaging from the U.S. to Larry Roberts in England in 1973 to request the return of his electric razor. At the time, use of the ARPANET for personal reasons was unlawful.

Internet 
Kleinrock published hundreds of research papers that ultimately launched a new field of research on the theory and application of queuing theory to computer networks. In this role, he supervised the research of scores of graduate students. He disseminated his research and that of his students to wider audiences for academic and commercial use. Kleinrock's theoretical work on network design, hierarchical routing, wireless network access, network measurement, network congestion control, and nomadic computing in the late 1970s with student Farouk Kamoun remains critical to the operation of the Internet today.

Crocker, Cerf, Postel and others at DARPA, Stanford University and other collaborating groups, went on to develop the conventions, the Request for Comments, and the communication protocols for internetworking that led to the Internet protocol suite.

In 1988, Kleinrock was the chairman of a group that presented the report Toward a National Research Network to the U.S. Congress,  concluding that "There is a clear and urgent need for a national research network". Although the U.S. did not build a nationwide national research and education network, this report  influenced Al Gore to pursue the development of the High Performance Computing Act of 1991, which helped facilitate development of the Internet as it is known today. Funding from the bill was used in the development of the 1993 web browser Mosaic at the National Center for Supercomputing Applications (NCSA), which accelerated the adoption of the World Wide Web.

Packet switching 'paternity dispute' 
In 1990, Kleinrock said:The thing that really drove my own research was the idea of a message switching network, which was a precursor to the packet switching networks. The mathematical tool that had been developed in queueing theory, namely queueing networks, matched perfectly the model of computer networks. Actually, it didn't match perfectly and I had to adjust that model to fit the realities of computer networks. Then I developed some design procedures as well for optimal capacity assignment, routing procedures and topology design. 
Beginning in the mid-1990s, Kleinrock sought to be recognized "as the father of modern data networking". In 2004, he described his work as:Basically, what I did for my PhD research in 1961-1962 was to establish a mathematical theory of packet networks which uncovered the underlying principles that drives today's Internet.

However, Kleinrock's claims that his work in the early 1960s originated the concept of packet switching and that this work was the source of the packet switching concepts used in the ARPANET are disputed by other Internet pioneers, including Robert Taylor, Paul Baran, and Donald Davies. Baran and Davies are recognized by historians and the U.S. National Inventors Hall of Fame for independently inventing the concept of digital packet switching used in modern computer networking including the Internet.

Awards and recognition

Kleinrock made several important contributions to the field of computer science, in particular to the theoretical foundations of data communication in computer networking. He has received numerous professional awards. In 1980, he was elected a member of the National Academy of Engineering for pioneering contributions to the field and leadership as an educator in computer communications networks. In 2001 he received the Draper Prize "for the development of the Internet". Kleinrock was selected to receive the prestigious National Medal of Science, the nation's highest scientific honor, from President George W. Bush in the White House on September 29, 2008. "The 2007 National Medal of Science to Leonard Kleinrock for his fundamental contributions to the mathematical theory of modern data networks, and for the functional specification of packet switching, which is the foundation of Internet technology. His mentoring of generations of students has led to the commercialization of technologies that have transformed the world."

In 2010 he shared the Dan David Prize. UCLA Room 3420 at Boelter Hall was restored to its condition of 1969 and converted into the Kleinrock Internet Heritage Site and Archive. It opened to the public with a grand opening attended by Internet pioneers on October 29, 2011.

He was elected as a member into the National Academy of Engineering. In 2012, Kleinrock was inducted into the Internet Hall of Fame by the Internet Society. Leonard Kleinrock was inducted into IEEE-Eta Kappa Nu (IEEE-ΗΚΝ) in 2011 as an Eminent Member.  The designation of Eminent Member is the organization's highest membership grade and is conferred upon those select few whose outstanding technical attainments and contributions through leadership in the fields of electrical and computer engineering have significantly benefited society. He was elected to the 2002 class of Fellows of the Institute for Operations Research and the Management Sciences. In September 2014, Leonard Kleinrock was awarded the ACM SIGMOBILE Outstanding Contribution Award at MobiCom 2014.

Leonard Kleinrock has been granted with the 2014 BBVA Foundation Frontiers of Knowledge Award "for his seminal contributions to the theory and practical development of the Internet," in the words of the jury's citation.

See also
 History of the Internet
Internet pioneers
 Nerds 2.0.1 – 1998 documentary in which Kleinrock gives a lengthy interview

Works

References

Bibliography

External links 

Biography of Leonard Kleinrock from the Institute for Operations Research and the Management Sciences

  Kleinrock discusses his work on the ARPANET; his dissertation work in queueing theory; and his move to the University of California at Los Angeles (UCLA). As one of the main contractors for the ARPANET, Kleinrock describes his involvement in discussions before the official DARPA request was issued, the people involved in the ARPANET work at UCLA, the installation of the first node of the network, the Network Measurement Center, and his relationships with Lawrence Roberts and the IPT Office, Bolt, Beranek and Newman, and the Network Analysis Corporation.
 Video:
 Video:
 Video:
 Video:

1934 births
American computer scientists
The Bronx High School of Science alumni
City College of New York alumni
Fellows of the Association for Computing Machinery
Internet pioneers
Living people
MIT School of Engineering alumni
Queueing theorists
University of California, Los Angeles faculty
Jewish American scientists
Draper Prize winners
Fellows of the Institute for Operations Research and the Management Sciences
Members of the United States National Academy of Engineering
20th-century American scientists
21st-century American scientists
Scientists from New York City